Warner Sogefilms AIE was a film distribution label in Spain active from 1998 to 2005.

It was created in January 1998 as a joint venture of Sogecable (Prisa) and Warner Bros., bringing the demise of Sogepaq Distribución (a previous joint venture of Prisa and Polygram) and Warner Española (the former Spanish subsidiary of Warner Bros.). It took the legal form of Economic Interest Grouping (AIE). 1998 Warner Sogefilms titles include Barrio, The Miracle of P. Tinto, and The Stolen Years. It split up in 2005. Already in liquidation, Warner Sogefilms was handed a €2.4 million fine by the CNMC for having coordinated with other film majors to standardize their commercial policies.

References 

PRISA
Warner Bros.
Film distributors of Spain
Joint ventures
1990s in Spanish cinema
2000s in Spanish cinema